General Jackson is a riverboat—more specifically, a showboat—based on the Cumberland River in Nashville, Tennessee.

General Jackson was named after another riverboat of the same name that was built in 1817; that boat was in turn named for Andrew Jackson. The modern boat was originally an attraction at the Opryland USA theme park. The park closed in 1997, but the boat remains in service, docking at Pennington Bend near the Opry Mills shopping center that replaced the park.  In addition to Opry Mills, the dock is located near the Grand Ole Opry House and the Gaylord Opryland Resort & Convention Center.

The original captains were Captain E.A. Poe and Captain William Howell.

Specifications

General Jackson was built by Jeffboat in Jeffersonville, Indiana and launched in 1985. The boat has a capacity of 1,200 passengers and 157 crew members.

Shows
General Jackson is designed to recreate the showboats that plied the waters of American rivers in the 19th century. Several different shows are presented during the primary March–December season, with two cruises usually taken each day. Evening cruises normally feature dining as well. Most cruises feature the country music for which the Opry is known, though variety musicals and gospel music are also featured.

The boat occasionally ventures from its home port of Nashville. In October 2006, General Jackson took part in the Tall Stacks riverboat heritage festival in Cincinnati, Ohio.

References

External links
General Jackson official web site

Culture of Nashville, Tennessee
General Jackson
Ships built in Jeffersonville, Indiana
Transportation in Nashville, Tennessee
Tourist attractions in Tennessee
1985 ships
Tourist attractions in Nashville, Tennessee
Ryman Hospitality Properties